Cedro is a census-designated place (CDP) in Bernalillo County, New Mexico, United States. The population was 430 at the 2010 census. It is part of the Albuquerque Metropolitan Statistical Area.

Geography
Cedro is located in eastern Bernalillo County. It is bordered to the south by the Ponderosa Pine CDP. The center of Cedro lies in Cedro Canyon in the northern end of the Manzano Mountains southeast of Albuquerque.

Demographics

Education
It is zoned to Albuquerque Public Schools.

References

Census-designated places in Bernalillo County, New Mexico
Census-designated places in New Mexico
Albuquerque metropolitan area